Judge Simons may refer to:

Charles Earl Simons Jr. (1916–1999), judge of the United States District Court for the District of South Carolina
Charles C. Simons (1876–1964), judge of the United States Court of Appeals for the Sixth Circuit